Jaroslav Fragner (25 December 1898, in Prague – 3 January 1967, in Prague) was a Czech modernist architect. Fragner was one of the prominent designers of functionalist architecture in the Czech Republic. He was a member of the avant garde group Devětsil and later Mánes Union of Fine Arts.

References

External links 

1898 births
1967 deaths
Czech architects